Ch'u-chou may refer to:

Chuzhou, or Ch'u-chou in Wade–Giles, a city in Anhui, China
Chuzhou (disambiguation)
Quzhou, or Ch'ü-chou in Wade–Giles, a city in Zhejiang, China
Quzhou (disambiguation)

See also
Zhuzhou, or Chu-chou in Wade–Giles, a city in Hunan, China
Zhuzhou (disambiguation)